Fort Riley is a United States Army installation located in North Central Kansas, on the Kansas River, also known as the Kaw, between Junction City and Manhattan. The Fort Riley Military Reservation covers 101,733 acres (41,170 ha) in Geary and Riley counties. The portion of the fort that contains housing development is part of the Fort Riley census-designated place, with a residential population of 7,761 as of the 2010 census. The fort has a daytime population of nearly 25,000. The ZIP Code is 66442.

Namesake
Fort Riley is named in honor of Major General Bennet C. Riley, who led the first military escort along the Santa Fe Trail. The fort was established in 1853 as a military post to protect the movement of people and trade over the Oregon, California, and Santa Fe trails. In the years after the Civil War, Fort Riley served as a major United States Cavalry post and school for cavalry tactics and practice. The post was a base for skirmishes with Native Americans after the Civil War ended in 1865, during which time George A. Custer was stationed at the fort.

United States Cavalry School
In 1887, Fort Riley became the site of the United States Cavalry School. The famous all-black 9th and 10th Cavalry Regiments, the soldiers of which were called "Buffalo Soldiers", were stationed at Fort Riley at various times in the 19th and early 20th centuries. During World War I, the fort was home to 50,000 soldiers, and it is sometimes identified as ground zero for the 1918 Spanish flu pandemic, which its soldiers were said to have spread all over the world. Since the end of World War II, various infantry divisions have been assigned there. Most notably, from 1970 to 1996 the post was home to the famed 1st Infantry Division, also called "Big Red One". Between 1999–2006, the post was headquarters to the 24th Infantry Division (Mechanized) and known as "America's Warfighting Center". In August 2006, the Big Red One relocated its headquarters to Fort Riley from Leighton Barracks, Germany.

Camp Whitside is named in honor of Brigadier General Samuel M. Whitside, who served as commander of Company B, 6th Cavalry Regiment, at Fort Riley, between the years of 1871 and 1874.

Stationed units 
1st Infantry Division
 Headquarters and Headquarters Battalion, 1st Infantry Division
 1st Brigade Combat Team, 1st Infantry Division
 2d Brigade Combat Team, 1st Infantry Division
 1st Infantry Division Artillery (DIVARTY)
 Combat Aviation Brigade, 1st Infantry Division
 1st Infantry Division Sustainment Brigade

Garrison
 97th Military Police Battalion
 Headquarters and Headquarters Company, U.S. Army Garrison

Partners
 10th Air Support Operations Squadron, USAF
 407th Army Field Support Brigade
 902d Military Intelligence Group
 Det. 2, 3d Weather Squadron, USAF
 Irwin Army Community Hospital
 Warrior Transition Battalion
 1st Signal Command, inactivated in 1969
 630th Ordnance Company (Explosive Ordnance Disposal)
 774th Ordnance Company (Explosive Ordnance Disposal)
 923d Contracting Battalion
 121st Signal Battalion, inactivated 1995

History

Origins
The early history of Fort Riley is closely tied to the movement of people and trade along the Oregon and Santa Fe trails. These routes, a result of then-popular United States doctrine of "manifest destiny" in the middle of the 19th century, prompted increased American military presence for the protection of American interests in this largely unsettled territory. During the 1850s, a number of military posts were established at strategic points to provide protection along these arteries of emigration and commerce.

In the fall of 1852, a surveying party under the command of Captain Robert H. Chilton, 1st U.S. Dragoons, selected the junction of the Republican and Smoky Hill Rivers as a site for one of these forts. This location, approved by the War Department in January 1853, offered an advantageous location from which to organize, train and equip troops in protecting the overland trails.

Surveyors believed the location near the center of the United States and named the site, Camp Center. During the late spring, three companies of the 6th Infantry occupied the camp and began construction of temporary quarters.

On June 27, 1853, Camp Center became Fort Riley — named in honor of Maj. Gen. Bennet C. Riley, who had led the first military escort along the Santa Fe Trail in 1829. The "fort" took shape around a broad plain that overlooked the Kansas River valley.

The fort's design followed the standard frontier post configuration: buildings were constructed of the most readily available material — in this case, native limestone.

In the spring, troops were dispatched to escort mail trains and protect travel routes across the plains. At the fort, additional buildings were constructed under the supervision of Capt. Edmund Ogden.

Anticipating greater utilization of the post, Congress authorized appropriations in the spring of 1855 to provide additional quarters and stables for the Dragoons. Ogden again marshaled resources and arrived from Leavenworth in July with 50 6-mule teams loaded with materials, craftsmen and laborers.

Work had progressed for several weeks when cholera broke out among the workers. The epidemic lasted only a few days but claimed 70 lives, including Ogden's. Work gradually resumed and buildings were readied for the arrival in October of the 2nd Dragoons.

As the fort began to take shape, an issue soon to dominate the national scene was debated during the brief territorial legislative session which met at Pawnee in the present area of Camp Whitside, named for Col. Warren Whitside.

The first territorial legislature met there in July 1855. Slavery was a fact of life and an issue within the garrison just as it was in the rest of the country. The seeds of sectional discord were emerging that would lead to "Bleeding Kansas" and, eventually, Civil War.

Increased tension and bloodshed between pro and anti-slavery settlers resulted in the use of the Army to "police" the troubled territory. They also continued to guard and patrol the Santa Fe Trail in 1859 and 1860 due to increased Indian threats.

The outbreak of hostilities between the North and South in 1861 disrupted garrison life. Regular units returned east to participate in the Civil War while militia units from Kansas and other states used Riley as a base from which to launch campaigns to show the flag and offer a degree of protection to trading caravans using the Santa Fe Trail. In the early stages of the war, the fort was used to confine Confederate prisoners.

George A. Custer 
The conclusion of the Civil War in 1865 witnessed Fort Riley again assuming an importance in providing protection to railroad lines being built across Kansas. Evidence of this occurred in the summer and fall of 1866 when the 7th Cavalry Regiment was mustered-in at Riley and the Union Pacific Railroad reached the fort. Brevet Major General George A. Custer arrived in December to take charge of the new regiment. Soldiers from the Kansas Volunteer regiments, "Jenison's Jayhawks," that were wounded in the Battle of Westport were brought to Fort Riley for recovery.

The following spring, Custer and the 7th left Fort Riley to participate in a campaign on the high plains of western Kansas and eastern Colorado.

The campaign proved inconclusive but resulted in Custer's court martial and suspension from the Army for one year—in part—for returning to Fort Riley to see his wife without permission.

As the line of settlement extended westward each spring, the fort lost some of its importance. Larger concentrations of troops were stationed at Fort Larned and Fort Hays, where they spent the summer months on patrol and wintered in garrison.

Between 1869 and 1871, a school of light artillery was conducted at Fort Riley by the 4th Artillery Battery. Instruction was of a purely practical nature, and regular classes were not conducted. Critiques were delivered during or following the exercise. This short-lived school closed in March 1871 as the War Department imposed economy measures, which included cutting a private's monthly pay from $12 to $9.

During the next decade, various regiments of the infantry and cavalry were garrisoned at Riley. The spring and summer months usually witnessed a skeletal complement at the fort while the remainder of the troops were sent to Forts Hays, Wallace, and Dodge in western Kansas. With the approach of winter, these troops returned to Riley. Regiments serving here during this time included the 5th, 6th, and 9th Cavalry and the 16th Infantry Regiment.

The lessening of hostilities with the Indian tribes of the Great Plains resulted in the closing of many frontier forts. Riley escaped this fate when Lt. Gen. Philip Sheridan recommended in his 1884 annual report to Congress to make the fort "Cavalry Headquarters of the Army."

Fort Riley was also used by state militia units for encampments and training exercises. The first such maneuver occurred in the fall of 1902 with subsequent ones held in 1903, 1904, 1906–1908 and 1911. These exercises gave added importance to the fort as a training facility and provided reserve units a valuable opportunity for sharpening their tactical skills.

Buffalo Soldiers
The 9th and 10th Cavalry Regiments — the famed "Buffalo Soldiers," so called by the indigenous peoples for the similarity to the short curly haired buffalo that roamed the plains — have been stationed at Fort Riley several times during their history. Shortly after their formation in 1866, the 9th Cavalry passed through here en route to permanent stations in the southwest. They returned during the early 1880s and the early part of the 20th century before being permanently assigned as troop cadre for the Cavalry School during the 1920s and 1930s.

The 10th Cavalry was stationed here in 1868 and 1913.

On the eve of World War II, the 9th and 10th Cavalry became part of the 2nd Cavalry Division, which was briefly stationed at Fort Riley.

The following two decades have been described as the golden age of the cavalry. Certainly it was, in terms of refining the relationship between horse and rider. Army horsemen and the training they received at the United States Army Cavalry School made them among the finest mounted soldiers in the world and the School's reputation ranked with the French and Italian Cavalry Schools. Horse shows, hunts and polo matches – long popular events on Army post – were a natural outgrowth of cavalry training.

The Cavalry School Hunt was officially organized in 1921 and provided a colorful spectacle on Sunday mornings. These activities gave rise to the perception of a special quality of life at Fort Riley that came to be known as the "Life of Riley." The technological advances demonstrated on the battlefields of Europe and World War I – most notable the tank and machine gun – raised questions in the inter-war years over the future of cavalry. By the late 1920s, the War Department directed development of a tank force by the Army. This was followed by activation of the 7th Cavalry Brigade (Mechanized) at Fort Knox, Kentucky, in the fall of 1936 to make-up the 2nd Regiment of this brigade.

In October 1938, the 7th Cavalry Brigade (Mech.) marched from Fort Knox to Fort Riley and took part in large-scale combine maneuvers of horse and mechanized units. These exercises helped prove the effectiveness of mechanical doctrine.

World War I

America's entry into World War I resulted in many changes at Fort Riley. Facilities were greatly expanded, and a cantonment named Camp Funston was built 5 miles (8 km) east of the permanent post during the summer and fall of 1917. This training site was one of 16 across the country and could accommodate from 30,000 to 50,000 men.

The first division to train at Camp Funston, the 89th, sailed for France in the spring of 1918. The 10th Division also received training at Funston but the armistice came before the unit was sent overseas.

The camp was commanded by Maj. Gen. Leonard Wood. A Military Officers Training Camp was established in the Camp Whitside area to train doctors and other medical personnel.

Following the war, the War Department directed service schools be created for all arms of service. As a result, in 1919, the Mounted Service School, as it was known since 1907 and which had ceased to function during the war, was re-designated as the United States Army Cavalry School. The change was sudden and abrupt. The new school met the need for courses both broader in scope and more general in character. The Cavalry unit at camp Funston was the 2nd cavalry Regiment who provide the training and cavalry tactics to new cavalry officers. The current post headquarters was in the 1920s post hospital.

World War II
Gathering war clouds in Europe and Asia during the late 1930s caused some military planners to prepare for possible U. S. involvement. This led to several important developments at Fort Riley. The first was the rebuilding of Camp Funston and the stationing of the 2nd Cavalry Division there in December 1940. Barracks were built in the area known as Republican Flats and renamed Camp Forsyth. In addition, 32,000 acres (13,000 ha) were added to the post for training purposes. These efforts were brought into sharp focus with America's entry into World War II.

Over the next four years, approximately 125,000 soldiers were trained at these facilities. Notable trainees included heavyweight boxing champion, Joe Louis, Indy car driver Walt Faulkner, and motion picture stars such as Mickey Rooney. The post also received a presidential visit by Franklin Roosevelt on Easter Sunday 1943.

The 9th Armored Division was organized here in July 1942 and after its deployment, Camp Funston was used as a German prisoner of war camp. Fort Riley had branch POW camps, a large branch Camp Phillips in Salina, and 12 smaller branch camps in Kansas and Missouri: Council Grove, El Dorado, Eskridge, Hutchinson, Lawrence, Neodesha, Ottawa, Peabody, Wadsworth, Grand Pass, Lexington, Liberty.

The arrival of victory in Europe and Japan during the spring and summer of 1945, were joyous occasions, but they also spelled new realities and directions for the Army and Fort Riley.

Korean War
In the aftermath of World War II, the fort experienced a period of transition. The Cavalry School ceased operation in November 1946, and the last tactical horse unit inactivated the following March. Replacing the Cavalry School was the Ground General School, which trained newly commissioned officers in basic military subjects. An officer's candidate course was conducted along with training officers and enlisted men in intelligence techniques and methods. The 10th Mountain Division was activated July 1, 1948, at Fort Riley, Kansas. The 16-week basic military program conducted by this division prepared soldiers for infantry combat and duty with other infantry units.

The invasion of South Korea by North Korean forces in June 1950, once again brought attention to Fort Riley as an important training facility. Over the next few years, recruits from all over the United States came to Fort Riley and received basic training.

The 37th Infantry Division, made up of units from the Ohio National Guard, was also stationed here during the conflict. While they were not sent overseas, their presence was a continuing reinforcement of the fort's importance as a training post.

Cold War
The uneasy truce that settled on the Korean peninsula after 1953 was indicative of a cold war that had come to characterize relations between the United States and the Soviet Union. This would affect Fort Riley.

In 1955, the fort's utilization changed from training and educational center to that of being the home base for a major infantry division. In that year, the 10th Division rotated to Germany as part of Operation Gyroscope and was replaced by the 1st Infantry Division. Elements of the Big Red One began arriving in July 1955 and over the next four years the remaining units arrived, the last being the 2nd Battle Group, 8th Infantry, in December, 1959. The initial units occupied barracks located in Camp Funston, until new barracks were built on Custer Hill. Ultimately, the 1st Battle Group, 5th Infantry would be stationed at Funston, with the other units of the division divided between Custer Hill, Forsythe and Main post.

Operation Long Thrust
Consistent with President Kennedy's August 1961 directive to augment U.S. Berlin Brigade, in 1962–1963 1st Infantry Division rotated four Infantry Battle Group Task Forces (reinforced by Big Red One Artillery and Transportation units) from Fort Riley to West Germany from where they motor marched through communist East Germany to surrounded West Berlin. 1st Division units involved were 2nd Battle Group, 12th Infantry; 1st Battle Group, 13th Infantry; 1st Battle Group, 28th Infantry; & 2nd Battle Group, 26th Infantry. 2/12th was in Berlin during the Cuban Missile Crisis. 1/28th greeted President Kennedy on 26 June 1963, the day of his memorable "Ich bin ein Berliner" speech.

The influx of troops and dependents placed new demands on the fort's infrastructure. Work began on Custer Hill where new quarters, barracks and work areas were constructed. A new hospital, named in honor of Major General B. J. D. Irwin, was constructed to provide medical care.

In the decade following, 1st Infantry Division units trained to respond to any threat that might arise in Europe or other parts of the world. Construction of the Berlin Wall in 1961 and Cuban Missile Crisis the following year witnessed heightened alert for soldiers stationed at Fort Riley.

An additional 50,000 acres (20,000 ha) were also acquired in 1966, which enabled the Army to have an adequate training area for the division's two brigades.

Vietnam
Increased guerrilla insurgency in South Vietnam during the mid-1960s, led to the deployment of the 1st Infantry Division to Southeast Asia. The leading element, the 1st Battalion, 18th Infantry, left in July 1965 with the Division Headquarters arriving in South Vietnam in September. During this same year, a provisional basic combat training brigade was organized at Fort Riley and in February 1966, the 9th Infantry Division was reactivated and followed the 1st Infantry Division into combat.

Fort Riley's use as a divisional post was maintained with the arrival of the 24th Infantry Division. The division remained in Germany until September 1968, when it redeployed two brigades to Fort Riley as part of the REFORGER (Return of Forces to Germany) program. One brigade was maintained in Germany.

Following nearly five years of combat in Vietnam, the 1st Infantry Division returned to Fort Riley in April 1970 and assumed the NATO commitment. The division's 3rd Brigade was stationed in West Germany. During the 1970s and the 1980s, 1st Infantry Division soldiers were periodically deployed on REFORGER exercises.

Reserve Officer Training Corps summer camps were also held at the fort, which permitted troops to demonstrate and teach their skills to aspiring second lieutenants. The fort also hosted the model U. S. Army Correctional Brigade, housed in Camp Funston, and the 3rd ROTC Region Headquarters until their inactivation in 1992.

The Gulf War
In August 1990, Iraq invaded its neighbor, Kuwait. The resulting international outcry led to the largest U.S. troop build-up and deployment overseas since the Vietnam War. In the fall of that year, Fort Riley was notified to begin mobilization of troops and equipment for deployment to the Persian Gulf. Between November 1990 and January 1991, soldiers and equipment were deployed overseas.

In addition to the 1st Infantry Division, 27 non-divisional units were deployed and twenty-four reserve components were mobilized. This amounted to 15,180 soldiers being sent overseas via 115 aircraft. Over 2,000 rail cars transported 3,000 short tons of equipment which were then shipped to theater on 18 vessels.

Once in theater, the soldiers and equipment were readied for combat. This commenced in late February 1991, and over the course of the "hundred hours" combat of Operation Desert Storm, these soldiers carried out their orders and executed their missions that resulted in the crushing of Saddam Hussein's Republican Guards. Later that spring, the soldiers returned to Fort Riley.

The 1990s and beyond
Following Operation Desert Storm, the 1st Infantry Division returned to Fort Riley. But the winds of change were once again blowing across the Army and affected the post. The Cold War of the past four decades was being replaced by new realities in Eastern Europe with the crumbling of the Iron Curtain. Budget cuts and revised strategic thinking resulted in troop cutbacks.

In the spring of 1995, the headquarters of the 1st Infantry Division was transferred from Fort Riley to Germany. The 1st Brigade of the Big Red One remained at the post, along with 3rd Brigade, 1st Armored Division and the 937th Engineer Group.

On June 5, 1999, Fort Riley once again became a Division Headquarters with the reactivation of the 24th Infantry Division (Mechanized). The 24th Infantry Division (Mech.) is the Headquarters for three enhanced Separate Brigades (eSBs) of the Army National Guard. Under the integrated Active Component/Reserve Component concept, the 24th Infantry Division (Mech.) consists of an active component headquarters at Fort Riley and three enhanced Separate Brigades: 30th Heavy Separate Brigade at Clinton, North Carolina, 218th Heavy Separate Brigade at Columbia, South Carolina, and the 48th Separate Infantry Brigade in Macon, Georgia. These units were on eight-year training cycles that culminate in a National Training Center rotation. They also back-fill active duty units for Major Theater War contingencies and provide units for Stabilization Force rotations in Bosnia.

On April 21, 2003, the 3rd Brigade 1st Armored Division deployed in support of Operation Iraqi Freedom. The 3rd Brigade conducted combat operation in and around Baghdad, Iraq in support of the 1st Armored Divisions mission to secure and stabilize the city of Baghdad. Over the next 9 years, Fort Riley units supported combat operations both Iraq and Afghanistan.

On June 1, 2006, Fort Riley began training Military Transition Teams, or MiTTs. These 10-15 man teams from across the Army, Navy and Air Force train at Fort Riley's Camp Funston for 60 days. Transition Team training is focused training preparing teams to train, mentor and advise Iraqi and Afghan security forces. Training is based on core competencies—combat skills, force protection, team support processes, technical and tactical training, adviser skills, counter insurgency operations and understanding the culture.

Soldiers from Fort Riley continue to be deployed to areas in all corners of the world. From Southwest Asia to the Caribbean and the Balkans, Fort Riley soldiers have been engaged in numerous peacekeeping and nation-building missions. They continue to hone their skills by periodic deployments to the National Training Center located at Fort Irwin, California and the Joint Readiness Training Center at Fort Polk, Louisiana.

Return of the 1st Infantry Division

On August 1, 2006, the 1st Infantry Division returned to Fort Riley and replaced the 24th Infantry Division as the post's main Division.

In October 2006, the 1st Brigade, 1st Infantry Division, assumed command and control of the Military Transition Team training mission. The entire division took the lead on this mission for the military. The mission was moved from Fort Riley to Fort Polk, LA, in the summer of 2009.

Environmental contamination
The Fort Riley site has contaminated groundwater stemming from years of improper waste disposal. Wastes at the site include pesticides, vinyl chloride, solvents, perchloroethylene (PCE) and other volatile organic compounds. The United States Environmental Protection Agency listed Fort Riley as a Superfund site in 1990. Major cleanup activities at the site took place in the 1990s, while environmental monitoring of the site continues as of 2017.

Irwin Army Hospital
A year after the post was established in 1853, a temporary hospital was constructed near the present day Post/Cavalry Museum and Patton Hall on the main post. A permanent hospital, which is now the Post/Cavalry Museum, was built in 1855 with a clock tower added in 1890. The second hospital replaced the 1855 hospital in 1888 and is now Post Headquarters. A third hospital was built in 1941 at Camp Whitside and named Cantonment Hospital, later Station Hospital. The second hospital remained as an annex until 1957. The fourth hospital (now known as the "Legacy Hospital") was dedicated in 1958, and a new facility on the site of the previous Station Hospital opened in 2016. The Legacy and current hospitals were named after Brigadier General Bernard John Dowling Irwin "The Fighting Doctor" who won the Medal of Honor for distinguished gallantry in action during an engagement with the Chiricahua Indians near Apache Pass, Arizona Territory, in February 1861. As of 2016 the hospital has 47 beds and is staffed by 45 physicians.

Fort Riley Museums

 U.S. Cavalry Museum — housed in the building used as headquarters by George A. Custer, the museum houses exhibits about the United States Cavalry from the Revolutionary War to 1950
 1st Infantry Division Museum — exhibits relating to the 1st Infantry Division from 1917 to the present and the United States Constabulary forces that served in Germany immediately following World War II
 Custer Home, 24 Sheridan Avenue — Historic house museum
 First Territorial Capitol of Kansas — History of Territorial Kansas
 M65 atomic cannon, on the hills overlooking Marshall Airfield (no longer accessible)

Notable people
 Barbara Babcock, actress
 Pattie Brooks, singer
 Frank Buckles, last surviving American World War One veteran
 Enos Cabell, former third baseman and first baseman in Major League Baseball, played for the Baltimore Orioles, Houston Astros, San Francisco Giants, Detroit Tigers, and the Los Angeles Dodgers
 George A. Custer, General
 Johnny Damon, professional baseball player
 Chris Faust, landscape photographer
 Wallace Ford, Hollywood actor, was stationed at the Fort during World War I
 Clara Lanza, author born in Fort Riley
 Timothy McVeigh, perpetrator of the 1995 Oklahoma City bombing
 Robert K. Preston, served two months of hard labor
 Daisy Maude Orleman Robinson, World War I doctor, first woman dermatologist in the United States
 Jackie Robinson, first African-American to play in Major League Baseball, former second baseman for the Brooklyn Dodgers
 John A. Seitz, U.S. Army general
 Dave Wallace, member of the Arkansas House of Representatives for Mississippi County; decorated Army veteran of the Vietnam War; formerly stationed at Fort Riley
 Pi'erre Bourne, rapper, singer and record producer born in Fort Riley

References

External links

 
 Fort Riley History
 U.S. Cavalry Museum
 Fort Riley Museums information
 Guide to Fort Riley attractions and museums
 Atomic Cannon at Fort Riley
 Atomic Cannon history
 Atomic Cannon and other sites in Fort Riley
 Kansas forts and posts
 
 
 

Riley
Riley
Census-designated places in Kansas
Buildings and structures in Geary County, Kansas
Buildings and structures in Riley County, Kansas
Military Superfund sites
Superfund sites in Kansas
Historic American Buildings Survey in Kansas
1853 establishments in Indian Territory
Spanish flu